Raveena Ravi is an Indian dubbing artist and actress. She was born to voice actress Sreeja Ravi and actor-singer Ravindranathan Krishnan. She has dubbed several television advertisements directed by Rajiv Menon in Tamil, Malayalam and Telugu. She started dubbing for lead actresses with Saattai (2012). She debuted as an actress on-screen with Oru Kidayin Karunai Manu (2017).

Filmography

As a voice artist

Tamil

Malayalam

Telugu

As actress

See also
List of Indian Dubbing Artists

References

External links
 Raveena's Twitter Account

Indian voice actresses
Living people
Actresses in Tamil cinema
Actresses from Chennai
Actresses in Malayalam cinema
Year of birth missing (living people)